Beltrán Alfonso Osorio y Díez de Rivera, 18th Duke of Alburquerque, GE, OSL (15 December 1918 – 7 February 1994), also known as the 'Iron Duke' of Alburquerque, was a Spanish peer and jockey. A profound monarchist, he was a close friend and confidant of the heir to the throne of Spain, the Count of Barcelona, who he served as the Head of his Household from 1954 to 1993.

Beltrán was born in Madrid to one of the great noble houses of Spain. At its peak, the House of Alburquerque held 18 titles in the peerage of Spain, 6 of which had the status of Grandee. His father, Miguel Osorio y Martos, 17th Duke of Alburquerque, was Gentilhombre Grandee of king Alfonso XIII while his mother was Inés Díez de Rivera y Figueroa, daughter of the Counts of Almodóvar, also Grandees of Spain. The closeness of the Dukes of Alburquerque to the kings of Spain had existed for many generations; the 8th, 15th and 16th duke had all been Mayordomos mayores or Heads of the Royal Household. Aspiring to become an engineer was soon frustrated by the outbreak of the Spanish Civil War in 1936, which resulted in his enlistment in the cavalry of the nationalist faction, eventually becoming lieutenant colonel. 

His passion for equestrianism emerged after he was given his first pony age 5. On his 8th birthday, his father gifted him with a newsreel clip of the 1926 Grand National. He thereafter became enthusiastic with the idea of competing in it. The duke quickly became one of the promising horse riders of his home club, Puerta de Hierro, rising to prominence when he competed at the 1952 Summer Olympics and later at the 1960 Summer Olympics. His jockey career began when he came second in the Sussex Stakes at Lingfield Park. Despite the duke's unhelpful physique (he was as tall as a basketball player), he finally rode the Grand National as "gentleman rider" in 1952. Osorio also took part in 1963, 1965, 1966, 1973, when he already had 16 bone screws; in 1974, when he finished in a respectable 8th place; and finally at the remarkable age of 58 in 1976, breaking 7 ribs and vertebras, his right wrist and femur as well as suffering a severe concussion that gave him a two-day coma. As a result, the Jockey Club stewards declined to renew his riding permit and it was widely said that should he continue, "the hospital would run out of screws and the duke out of legs". 

The Duke of Alburquerque continued riding in Europe until he was 65. He retired leaving behind an extremely popular legacy, particularly in Britain, where he is remembered for his "courageous and injury-defying performances" at Aintree in which he and his horse "Nereo" became fundamental. On his death in 1994, a racing journalist described him as "an immensely popular character in British racing who cut the distinctive figure of being a tall, slender man with the nose and prominent chin of the traditional Spanish Grandee, closely resembling a Punch cartoon."

Biography

He was born in Madrid, his parents being Miguel Osorio y Martos, 17th Duke of Alburquerque, and Inés Díez de Rivera y Figueroa, daughter of the 5th Count of Almodóvar, who was also a Grandee.

In 1936, when he had not yet reached the legal age, he participated in the Spanish Civil War, on the Battle of Somosierra, later fighting in the Infantry Regiment of Navarre, at the command of the 4th Company of the Tercio de San Fermín, later passing to the Cavalry Regiment of the Army of the Centre. At the end of the war, he entered the General Military Academy, from which he left with the rank of lieutenant.

From 1954, and until 1993, he held the position of Head of the House of the Count of Barcelona, and for his service and dedication Juan Carlos I of Spain made him a knight of the Order of the Golden Fleece.

Jockey career

The duke became obsessed with winning Britain's Grand National Steeplechase horse race after watching a film of the race on his eighth birthday. However, each of his attempts ended in failure.

On his first attempt in 1952, he fell from his horse, waking up later in hospital with a cracked vertebra. He tried to win again in 1963, and fell from his horse yet again. (Bookies placed a bet of 66-1 against him finishing still on the horse). He raced again in 1965, but again fell from his horse after it collapsed underneath him, breaking his leg.

In 1974, after having sixteen screws removed from a leg he had broken after falling in another race, he also fell while training for the Grand National and broke his collarbone. He then competed in a plaster cast in the race, this time managing to finish, but only in eighth place.

In 1976, the duke fell again during the race, this time being trampled by other horses. He suffered seven broken ribs, several broken vertebrae, a broken wrist, a broken thigh, and a severe concussion which left him in a coma for two days.

At 57, the Iron Duke still tried to compete, but officials revoked his licence for "his own safety". He never won the Grand National, but broke more bones than any other jockey in attempting to do so.

Legacy

Alburquerque died in February 1994. His eldest son and heir, Juan Miguel Osorio y Bertrán de Lis (b. 1958), succeeded him as Duke of Alburquerque and most of his other titles in November of that year.

Jaime Peñafiel, a prominent journalist and lawyer in Spain, wrote of him at his death:

Marriage and issue

He married firstly in the Church of Saint Anthony of the Germans in Madrid on October 2, 1952 with Teresa Bertrán de Lis y Pidal (1923-1969), daughter of Vicente Carlos Luis Bertrán de Lis y Gurowski, 2nd Marquess of Bondad Real (himself a grandchild of Infanta Isabel Fernanda of Spain), and his wife María de la Concepción Pidal y Chico de Guzmán, of the House of the Marquesses of Pidal. She died in a car accident when her vehicle collided with that of Rafael Leónidas Trujillo, son of Rafael Trujillo, who would die a few days later. They were children of this first marriage:

Juan Miguel Osorio y Bertrán de Lis, 19th Duke of Alburquerque, who continues the line.
Teresa Osorio y Bertrán de Lis (b. 1962).
María Osorio y Bertrán de Lis (b. 1966), 14th Countess of Villaumbrosa.

He married secondly in Estoril on June 27, 1974 with María Cristina Malcampo y San Miguel (1935-2004), 15th Duchess of Parque, 7th Duchess of San Lorenzo de Valhermoso, 9th Marchioness of Casa Villavicencio, 9th Marchioness of San Rafael, 4th Countess of Joló, 3rd Viscountess of Mindanao, twice Grandee of Spain. They were children of this second marriage:

María Cristina Osorio y Malcampo (b. 1975), 8th Duchess of San Lorenzo de Valhermoso, 5th Countess of Joló, 4th Viscountess of Mindanao and 10th Marchioness of Casa Villavicencio.
María Rosa Osorio y Malcampo (*b. 1978), 16th Duchess of Parque and 10th Marchioness of San Rafael.

Titles and honours

Dukedoms
18th Duke of Alburquerque (GE)
7th Duke of Algete (GE)

Marquessates
19th Marquess of Alcañices (GE)
11th Marquess of Balbases (GE)
13th Marquess of Cadreita
17th Marquess of Cuéllar
9th Marquess of Cullera
13th Marquess of Montaos

Countships
12th Count of la Corzana (GE)
16th Count of Fuensaldaña
16th Count of Grajal
18th Count of Huelma
18th Count of Ledesma
15th Count of la Torre
14th Count of Villanueva de Cañedo
12th Count of Villaumbrosa

Honours
  House of Bourbon: Knight of the Order of the Golden Fleece (1993)
  House of Bourbon: Knight of the Order of Santiago (1982)
  House of Bourbon: Knight Grand Cross of Justice of the Order of Saint Lazarus
  Spain: Knight of the Order of Sports Merit

Heraldry

References

Bibliography
 
 
 

1918 births
1994 deaths
118
108
119
108
113
112
119
119
Spanish jockeys
Grandees of Spain
Spanish male equestrians
Olympic equestrians of Spain
Equestrians at the 1952 Summer Olympics
Equestrians at the 1960 Summer Olympics
Sportspeople from Madrid